Marty Riessen and Margaret Court were the defending champions, but Marty Riessen did not compete this year. Margaret Court teamed up with Željko Franulović and lost in semifinals to Bob Hewitt and Billie Jean King.

Bob Hewitt and Billie Jean King won in the final 3–6, 6–4, 6–2 against Jean-Claude Barclay and Françoise Dürr.

Seeds

Draw

Finals

Top half

Section 1

Section 2

Bottom half

Section 3

Section 4

References

External links
1970 French Open – Doubles draws and results at the International Tennis Federation

Mixed Doubles
French Open by year – Mixed doubles